Iraqi Refugee Camp may refer to:
 Iraqi Refugee Camp, Khuzestan
 Iraqi Refugee Camp, West Azerbaijan